In neurology and neuroscience research, steady state visually evoked potentials (SSVEP) are signals that are natural responses to visual stimulation at specific frequencies.  When the retina is excited by a visual stimulus ranging from 3.5 Hz to 75 Hz, the brain generates electrical activity at the same (or multiples of) frequency of the visual stimulus.

This technique is used widely with electroencephalographic research regarding vision and attention.  SSVEPs are useful in research because of the excellent signal-to-noise ratio and relative immunity to artifacts.  SSVEPs also provide a means to characterize preferred frequencies of neocortical dynamic processes.  SSVEP is generated by stationary localized sources and distributed sources that exhibit characteristics of wave phenomena.

See also
 Evoked potential

References

Sources 
 

 

Perception
Cognitive neuroscience
Evoked potentials
Electroencephalography